"Killa" is the first single by R&B American group Cherish from their second album, The Truth (2008). "Killa" features rapper Yung Joc. The song is about "not being able to resist the man you know is no good." It is their third single and was described by UK R&B writer Pete Lewis of the award-winning Blues & Soul as "a robustly funky single which finds the girls teaming up with chart-topping rugged male Southern rapper Yung Joc".

The song was released to iTunes in 2007. The video, directed by Little X, premiered via BET's Access Granted on December 12, 2007, featuring some scenes of the movie Step Up 2: The Streets. It was originally announced that there would be a So So Def remix featuring Jermaine Dupri and Rocko; however, even though Dupri was on the remix, Rocko was absent, with the other collaborator being the Kid Slim.

Track listings
iTunes single
 "Killa" (featuring Yung Joc) – 3:55
 "Killa" (instrumental) – 3:52

US 12-inch single
A1. "Killa" (main) (featuring Yung Joc) – 3:50
B1. "Killa" (instrumental) – 3:50
B2. "Killa" (a cappella) – 3:50

Charts

Weekly charts

Year-end charts

Release history

References

2006 songs
2007 singles
Capitol Records singles
Cherish (group) songs
Yung Joc songs